Allen Gauthier McCants (August 20, 1875 – December 14, 1953) was an American college football player and coach. He served as the head football coach at the University of Alabama in 1897. McCants was also a player for Alabama's inaugural football team in 1892. Due to a ban the university had placed on athletic teams traveling off campus, McCants' 1897 team only played one game, a 6–0 victory over the Tuscaloosa Athletic Club. As a further result of the ban, Alabama did not field a team in 1898. When the ban was lifted and football was resumed in 1899, W. A. Martin was named as the new head coach.

Head coaching record

References

1875 births
1953 deaths
19th-century players of American football
Alabama Crimson Tide football coaches
Alabama Crimson Tide football players
Sportspeople from Mobile, Alabama